Tradescantia humilis, the Texas spiderwort, is a species of Tradescantia native to Texas and southern Oklahoma. It was named after John Tradescant (1608-1662) who served as gardener to Charles I of England. It was described by US botanist Joseph Nelson Rose in 1899.

References

humilis
Plants described in 1899
Flora of Texas
Flora of Oklahoma
Garden plants
Flora without expected TNC conservation status